Loopre may refer to several places in Estonia:

Loopre, Jõgeva County, village in Pajusi Parish, Jõgeva County
Loopre, Viljandi County, village in Kõo Parish, Viljandi County